Arthur Byrne (born 14 September 1997), better known by his ring name Leyton Buzzard, is an English professional wrestler. He is currently signed to Insane Championship Wrestling (ICW), where he is a currently the ICW World Heavyweight Champion, and a one-time Zero-G Champion. He was previously a child actor on stage and screen, and was one of the twelve potential Olivers on the BBC talent show I'd Do Anything, making the final eight.

Acting career
Byrne first became involved in acting at the age of eight, and was encouraged by his parents who had seen their son sing along to Disney classics. A year later, his first role was when a production of Chitty Chitty Bang Bang came to Bristol, and he played the role of Jeremy Potts. Following this, he would be continuously working stage shows until 2008, when he appeared on the BBC talent show I'd Do Anything as a potential Oliver. On the show, he had a lead vocal on week three, singing "Teamwork", a song from Chitty Chitty Bang Bang. He made the final eight, and was eliminated in week nine, alongside four other boys. Byrne did in fact end up playing Oliver after his time on the show, at the Playhouse Theatre in July 2008. He later attended acting classes at the Sylvia Young Theatre School.

Byrne also had minor roles on film and television before his professional wrestling career, including playing the younger version of Martin McCreadie's character on The Five.

Professional wrestling career
At the age of eighteen, Byrne travelled up to Glasgow to train at the Glasgow Pro Wrestling Asylum.

Insane Championship Wrestling (2018–present)
In 2018, Leyton Buzzard made his debut for Insane Championship Wrestling (ICW), as the assistant to Joe Hendry. He was unwaveringly loyal to Hendry, who later added Kez Evans and Ravie Davie to his stable, the Dallas Mavericks. Eventually, Hendry got annoyed with Buzzard losing all the time, and began denigrating him more and more until Buzzard turned face. The feud between the two men culminated at Shug's Hoose 6, with the stipulation being a career versus freedom of speech match (if Buzzard won, Hendry would leave ICW, and if Hendry won, Buzzard would be forced to wear a mask and be silent until Fear & Loathing XII). On night one of the event, Buzzard defeated Hendry, by hitting a uranage and a 450 splash on him to win the match. On night two, Buzzard was announced as James Storm's opponent, after Storm attacked Grado before the bell rang. Towards the end, Grado interfered by performing a rolling cannonball to Storm in the corner, allowing Buzzard to hit a 450 splash, and win the match.

Following this, Buzzard would be in the involved in the title chase for the Zero-G Championship, ICW's junior heavyweight championship. On 12 October 2019, at Gonzo, Buzzard was defeated by reigning champion Liam Thomson in the main event. On 15 December, at Fight Club, Buzzard became the number one contender, by defeating longtime rival Kieran Kelly. Although the match would be set for Square Go! on 2 February 2020, Thomson, who was already booked for an open challenge title match, decided to defend the title against Buzzard the same night. Buzzard defeated Thomson to win his first title in ICW. On 19 January 2020, at Fight Club, Buzzard defeated TK Cooper in his first defence of the title. On 1 February, at Gonzo 3, Buzzard defeated Kenny Williams. The next day, at Square Go!, Buzzard dropped the title back to Thomson, ending his reign at 49 days. At ICW Fear and Loathing 2022, Buzzard won the ICW World Heavyweight Championship defeating Craig Anthony, Stevie James and former champion Kez Evans in a Four way elimination match.

As ICW World Heavyweight Champion, Buzzard declared he would be a "travelling World Champion" in the same way that Drew Galloway had for ICW in 2015. In addition to contests with LJ Cleary and Kenny Williams in Glasgow, he announced and made a series of title defences internationally for independent promotions in Canada, Ireland, Germany (Westside Xtreme Wrestling), Spain, Sweden and Italy.

Filmography

Film

Television

Video games

Championships and accomplishments
Fight Factory Pro Wrestling
FFPW Irish Junior Heavyweight Championship (1 time, current)
 Insane Championship Wrestling
 ICW World Heavyweight Championship (1 time, current)
 ICW Zero-G Championship (1 time)
 Scottish Wrestling Network
SWN Award for One to Watch [Male] (2020)
 Premier British Wrestling
 King of Cruisers (2019)
Preston City Wrestling / Pro Championship Wrestling
PCW Cruiserweight Championship (1 time)
 Scottish Wrestling Alliance
 Scottish X Championship (1 time)

References

External links

1998 births
Living people
Sportspeople from Bristol
English male child actors
English male stage actors
English male television actors
Alumni of the Sylvia Young Theatre School
English male professional wrestlers